John Theodore Cameron Bucke Collins (25 August 1925 – 8 December 2022) was a British Anglican priest who was instrumental in the charismatic revival movement in the Church of England.

Life
Previously from a high church background, Collins began his transition to a charismatic bent at an all-night prayer vigil in the winter of 1963, in what became known as the “Night of Prayer." According to Collins, "the 'visitation of the Holy Spirit' lasted three weeks and transformed his rundown church and young curates into catalysts for what would become known as the “Charismatic Renewal” in Britain." Despite the skepticism of his ecclesiastical superiors, Collins went on to become a key figure in the charismatic movement, which according to the historian Diarmaid MacCulloch was “one of the great surprises of 20th-century Christianity...A holiness movement [that] sprang out of the teaching of the early Methodists, proclaiming that the Holy Spirit could bring an intense experience of holiness or sanctification into the everyday life of any believing Christian.”

In 1980 Collins was appointed vicar of Holy Trinity Brompton, previously a sparsely-attended high church parish that he transformed into a bastion of the Charismatic Movement with an evening congregation of roughly 1,000. The parish would also function as the base for a church planting effort, taking over struggling parishes and moving them to an evangelical style of worship.

Family
Collins married Diana Kimpton (d. 2013), an actress, in 1955, having met at a London rally held by the U.S. evangelist Billy Graham. The couple had two children, Dominic and Richenda.

References

1925 births
2022 deaths
People educated at Haileybury and Imperial Service College
Alumni of Clare College, Cambridge
British Charismatics
Royal Air Force personnel of World War II